Gonzalo García Núñez (born 16 February 1947) is a Peruvian industrial engineer from the Peruvian University of Ingenieria, Lima 1968, Graduate of the French center of economics programs CEPE, Phd. in economics from Grenoble University, he is a professor, banker, entrepreneur, economist and politician.  Full Professor of Macroeconomics and industrial organisation of the Peruvian University of Engineering, he was elected General Secretary, President of the chapter of industrial and economics engineers, President of the Society of Professors of the University of engineering, secretary and chairman of the faculty of systems engineers and President of the national engineer institution of Peru, the Colegio de Ingenieros del Peru. With the Izquierda Unida party in 1983 he was elected Councillor of Lima, reelected in 1986 and he was candidate to the upper house of the Congress in 1990, under the Izquierda Socialista, but he was unsuccessful. He was an opponent of former President Alberto Fujimori in the Foro Democratico ngo. He was elected Central Bank director by an absolute majority of the Peruvian congress in 2001. Member of "Justice and Liberty" he was invited by Ollanta Humala, the  candidate of the Peruvian Nationalist Party and  he ran as Ollanta Humala's first Vice President during the 2006 national election on the coalition between Union for Peru and the Peruvian Nationalist Party.  The ticket won in the first round of voting with 30.6% of the total vote but lost in the second round (47.6%). Gonzalo Garcia was responsible of the large team of government planning of the ticket, editor of the plan named The Great Transformation, in honour of Karl Polanyi, and native name Llapanckik in Quechua.

García was formerly a member of the board of the Central Reserve Bank of Peru.  In this period the inflation was 2 per cent average between 2001 and 2006, the exchange rate was very stable and  the international reserves growth at the high level of the economic history of Peru. The board approved the inflation targeting rule in December 2001, proposed by experts of the bank, and ran the monetary policy with a very complex model of mathematical prevision and forecasts during the recent five years.  He also served in the UN system and he is  the author of the vision of Peruvian marginalized people and The Net of production system of Villa El Salvador, a shanty town of Lima. Since 1982 he has written editorials for La Republica, one of Peru's greatest newspapers. In October 2006, invited by Humala and his allies for the 2006 local and regional election, Gonzalo García was a candidate only of the Ollanta’s Nationalist Party and was not elected mayor of Lima, losing to the-then incumbent Mayor Luis Castañeda.

He works as a teacher in the Postgraduate section of UNI and a consultant for international scientific and technical cooperation organizations.

For the period 2011-2012, he was elected as President of the National Council of the Magistracy. who was elected by universal, direct and secret vote of the professionals of Peru.

References

Living people
1947 births
United Left (Peru) politicians
Socialist Left (Peru) politicians
Peruvian Nationalist Party politicians

Union for Peru politicians
People from Lima